Adele Kay Fielding is a British physician-scientist who is a Professor of Haematology at University College London. Fielding was President of the British Society for Haematology from 2020 until 2022.

Early life and education 
Fielding was a medical student at University College London. She was a trainee in haematology (the medical specialty covering blood disorders including cancer) and general medicine in London. She moved to the Medical Research Council laboratory in Cambridge for her doctoral research, and completed her doctorate in 1999.

Research and career 
In 1999, Fielding was appointed assistant professor at the Mayo Clinic. She returned to the United Kingdom in 2003, where she joined the Royal Free Hospital. She eventually moved to the University College London Hospitals NHS Foundation Trust, where she works in leukemia. Specifically, her research efforts look to improve the lives of people with acute lymphoblastic leukemia (ALL). She is part of several clinical trials into ALL, which include studying the underlying mechanisms and searching for new treatments. Fielding has developed an attenuated oncolytic measles virus that can be used as a treatment of ALL.

Fielding was elected President of the British Society for Haematology in 2020 and was succeeded in 2022 by Josh Wright.

Selected publications 

Burt R, Dey A, Aref S, Aguiar M, Akarca A, Bailey K, Day W, Hooper S, Kirkwood A, Kirschner K, Lee SW, Lo Celso C, Manji J, Mansour MR, Marafioti T, Mitchell RJ, Muirhead RC, Cheuk Yan Ng K, Pospori C, Puccio I, Zuborne-Alapi K, Sahai E, Fielding AK. Activated stromal cells transfer mitochondria to rescue acute lymphoblastic leukemia cells from oxidative stress. Blood. 2019 Oct 24;134(17):1415-1429. doi: 10.1182/blood.2019001398. PMID 31501154; PMCID: PMC6856969.
 Marks DI, Kirkwood AA, Rowntree CJ, Aguiar M, Bailey KE, Beaton B, Cahalin P, Castleton AZ, Clifton-Hadley L, Copland M, Goldstone AH, Kelly R, Lawrie E, Lee S, McMillan AK, McMullin MF, Menne TF, Mitchell RJ, Moorman AV, Patel B, Patrick P, Smith P, Taussig D, Yallop D, Alapi KZ, Fielding AK. Addition of four doses of rituximab to standard induction chemotherapy in adult patients with precursor B-cell acute lymphoblastic leukaemia (UKALL14): a phase 3, multicentre, randomised controlled trial. Lancet Haematol. 2022 Apr;9(4):e262-e275. doi: 10.1016/S2352-3026(22)00038-2. PMID 35358441; PMCID: PMC8969057.

References

External links 
 

Living people
20th-century British medical doctors
21st-century British medical doctors
British haematologists
Alumni of the University of London
Year of birth missing (living people)